Donald Arthur Carson (born December 21, 1946) is an evangelical biblical scholar. He is a Distinguished Emeritus Professor of New Testament at Trinity Evangelical Divinity School and president and co-founder of the Gospel Coalition. He has written or edited about sixty books and currently serves as president of the Evangelical Theological Society.

Carson has been described as doing "the most seminal New Testament work by contemporary evangelicals" and as "one of the last great Renaissance men in evangelical biblical scholarship." He has written on a wide range of topics including New Testament, hermeneutics, biblical theology, the Greek New Testament, the use of the Old Testament in the New, and more.

Early life and education
He studied at McGill University in sciences and earned a Bachelor of Science in 1967, a Master of Divinity from Heritage College & Seminary in 1970, and a Doctor of Philosophy in New Testament from the University of Cambridge in 1975.

Career
In 1975, he became professor of New Testament at the Northwest Baptist Seminary (Fellowship of Evangelical Baptist Churches in Canada) in Langley, British Columbia (city).

Carson joined the Trinity Evangelical Divinity School faculty in 1978 after then dean, Kenneth Kantzer, heard him deliver a paper at a theological conference.Carson served as Associate Professor of New Testament until 1982 when he became full professor. From 1991 to 2018, Carson was Research Professor of New Testament. He is now Emeritus Professor of New Testament.

Carson has authored and edited over 60 books. 

In 2005, Carson founded The Gospel Coalition along with pastor Tim Keller. The Gospel Coalition is known for its popular website, conferences, and other resource materials. Carson was the President of The Gospel Coalition until January 20, 2020, when Julius Kim was selected as his successor. Carson transitioned to the role of Theologian-at-Large.

In 2011, a Festschrift was published in his honor, entitled Understanding the Times: New Testament Studies in the 21st Century: Essays in Honor of D. A. Carson on the Occasion of His 65th Birthday. Contributors included Andreas J. Köstenberger, Grant Osborne, Mark Dever, Douglas Moo, Peter O'Brien, and Craig Blomberg.

Personal life
Carson married Joy (née Wheildon) on August 16, 1975.

Select works

Books

{{cite book |last=Carson |first=D. A. |author-mask=3 |title=For the Love of God, 2 volume devotional commentary based on Robert Murray M'Cheyne's system for reading the Bible through in one year |location=Wheaton, IL |publisher= Crossway Books |date=1998 |isbn=1-58134-815-0 }}

 – revised edition of A Call to Spiritual Reformation'' of 1992

As editor

Chapters and contributions

Articles

References

External links
Trinity Evangelical Divinity School's page on Dr. D. A. Carson 
D. A. Carson blog
D. A. Carson (Theopedia)
Debate Over Gender-Inclusive Language
 Editorial Publicaciones Andamio

Publications and Audio:
The Gospel Coalition collection: Includes a comprehensive bibliography (over 350 free PDFs) and sermons and lectures (about 500 free MP3s)

1946 births
20th-century Canadian Baptist ministers
20th-century Calvinist and Reformed theologians
20th-century Canadian male writers
20th-century Canadian non-fiction writers
20th-century Christian biblical scholars
21st-century Canadian Baptist ministers
21st-century Calvinist and Reformed theologians
21st-century Canadian male writers
21st-century Canadian non-fiction writers
21st-century Christian biblical scholars
Academic journal editors
Alumni of Emmanuel College, Cambridge
Baptist biblical scholars
Bible commentators
Canadian Baptist theologians
Canadian biblical scholars
Canadian Calvinist and Reformed ministers
Canadian Calvinist and Reformed theologians
Canadian evangelicals
Canadian male non-fiction writers
Canadian people of Northern Ireland descent
Christian bloggers
Critics of atheism
Editors of Christian publications
Living people
McGill University Faculty of Science alumni
New Testament scholars
Trinity International University faculty
Writers from Montreal
Heritage College & Seminary alumni